LP3 is the third studio album by American rock band Hippo Campus. It was released on February 4, 2022, through Grand Jury Music.

Background 
LP3 was first announced on October 18, 2021, alongside the release of its lead single "Boys". The album explores themes such as sexuality, long-distance relationships, mortality, and self-identity. In an interview with Finlay Holden from The Line of Best Fit, band members Jake Luppen and Nathan Stocker noted that the album was something of a "return to form," as interpersonal and creative clashes lead to their previous studio album, Bambi, departing from their vision of the core of the band. Holden himself commented that the individual experimentation and creative release of Bambi was crucial for the band's development, from which "a newfound perspective blossomed."

Track listing

References 

Hippo Campus albums
2022 albums